Carousell may refer to:
 Carousell, a pseudonym of British musician Richard Skelton
 Carousell (company), a Singaporean e-commerce company
 B&B Carousell, a historic carousel located in Coney Island, Brooklyn

See also
 Carousel (disambiguation)